Kobojsarna is a Eurodance group from Sweden, founded in 2003 by Mikael Collin (previously Danielsson), Emil Carlin, and Richard Mellberg (previously Pettersson). Richard left the group in 2010. Kobojsarna is the only group ever to win the Russ "Song of the Year" in Norway twice, and also twice in a row. They won both in 2007 with Sång Om Ingenting and in 2008 with Jag Vet Du Vill Ha Mig. Then in 2011 they came in second place with La Perla. Their single  Kobojsarna is a very popular band in Norway, the band has appeared at the VG-Lista Topp 20 and Russ events a number of times, both of which are highly popular with Norwegian youths. Kobojsarnas song Studentsången is one of Sweden's most played student songs during the graduation period in Sweden.

Kobojsarna has an average of 175.000 listeners on Spotify every month with more than 71 million streams in total on Spotify.

Musical career 
In 2006, before Facebook and Spotify, Kobojsarna created "Sång om Ingenting" and uploaded the track to their own website with no intent of it ever being played on the radio. In less than two weeks the song had been downloaded over 35.000 times. After that, the record companies started calling them and shortly after they published the song on Warner Chappell Music. "Sång om ingenting" ("Song about nothing" translated into English) was released in 2006 and reached number 22 in Sweden while being the number one song on the Swedish radio station NRJ and in the Top 7 list for over 8 weeks. And on the Swedish top list for 13 weeks. Their first ever live performance was on Sveriges Television on a show called Bobster. 

In 2007, Kobojsarna won "Song of the Year" in Norway with "Sång om Ingenting". Previous to that year, the only other Swedish artist to win was Basshunter who won in 2006 with Boten Anna. Then in 2008 they won again, as the first group ever to have won twice. And the first group ever to also win twice in a row. Later, in 2011 they came in second place with their song "La Perla". 

In their career, Kobojsarna created two music videos. The most recent one, "Jag vet att du vill ha mig", was created by Kobojsarna themselves. They have also made a remix of Markoolio's Emma, Emma, and have been remixed by artists such as Richi M and Ali Payami.

Their 2011 re-release of "Bambi", which is aptly called "Bambi 2011", placed in the Top 10 on the iTunes Electronic Chart in just one day, at 4th place.

Discography

Singles

Production credits

Notes

References

External links 
 Kobojsarna's official site

Swedish Eurodance groups
Swedish dance music groups
Warner Music Group artists
Swedish-language singers
Swedish boy bands